Admiral Sir Alan Kenneth Scott-Moncrieff,  (3 September 1900 – 25 November 1980) was a Royal Navy officer who served as Commander-in-Chief, Far East Fleet from 1955 to 1957.

Early life and education

Scott-Moncrieff was born in Buenos Aires, Argentina, the eldest son of Robert Lawrence Scott-Moncrieff and Victorine Troutbeck, whose father, John Brown Troutbeck, had settled in Buenos Aires. He was a cousin of Sir George Kenneth Scott-Moncrieff.

He was educated at the Royal Naval College at Osborne and Dartmouth.

Naval career

After the war, Scott-Moncrieff was made Chief of Staff to Admiral Sir Arthur Palliser, Commander-in-Chief in the East Indies and then commanded  from 1949. He was made Chairman of the Naval Advisory Committee at the North Atlantic Treaty Organization in 1950 and second-in-command Far East Fleet and commander of 5th Cruiser Squadron in 1951. He was appointed Commander of the Commonwealth Naval Forces serving in the Korean War in 1952 and Admiral commanding the Reserves in 1953. His last appointment was as Commander-in-Chief, Far East Fleet in 1955; in September 1955 he paid an official visit to Australia. He retired in 1958.

References

1900 births
1980 deaths
People educated at the Royal Naval College, Osborne
Graduates of Britannia Royal Naval College
Argentine military personnel
Commanders of the Legion of Merit
Commanders of the Order of the British Empire
Companions of the Distinguished Service Order
Knights Commander of the Order of the Bath
Recipients of the King Haakon VII Freedom Cross
Royal Navy admirals
Royal Navy personnel of the Korean War
Royal Navy personnel of World War I
Royal Navy personnel of World War II